Bob Gill is the world-record holding  motorcycle stuntman. He was one of the few jumpers to eschew the use of a landing ramp.

Racer to jumper 
Bob began as a motorcycle racer in 1962. Unsatisfied with the money he was making as a racer, he switched to jumping full-time in 1970. After several long jumps, including one jump 152 feet over the Cajun Canyon in Louisiana, he jumped over a set of Ryder trucks on May 10, 1973. The jump was filmed for a television commercial that was aired during Super Bowl VIII .

World record 
On July 17, 1973, Bob set a world record jump of  when he jumped over 22 cars with no landing ramp at Seattle International Raceway  in Kent, WA.

Appalachia Lake 
On August 18, 1974, Bob was scheduled to attempt a world record jump over the -wide Appalachia Lake in Bruceton Mills, West Virginia. Heavy rains in the area forced the postponement of the jump to August 25.

The jump was performed without the aid of a landing ramp. He landed three feet short on the embankment of the far side of the lake. Thrown from the bike, he suffered severe spinal cord injuries that left him permanently paralyzed.

Today 
Bob founded "Bob Gill Awareness Foundation" and resides in Tampa Bay, Florida.

Sources 
 Morgantown, West Virginia Dominion-Post, August 19, 1974

External links 
 Bob Gill's page at cyclejumpers.com
 photos of the jump and crash at Appalachia Lake
 The Bob Gill Awareness Foundation, Inc. (BGAF)
 Bob Gill Daredevil Site

References 

American motorcycle racers
American stunt performers
Living people
1945 births